Taeniogonalos gundlachii is a species of hymenopteran in the family Trigonalidae.

References

Further reading

External links

 

Parasitic wasps
Insects described in 1865